Giovanni Antonio de Paola (died 1591) was a Roman Catholic prelate who served as Bishop of Belcastro (1577–1591).

Biography
On 10 May 1577, Giovanni Antonio de Paola was appointed during the papacy of Pope Gregory XIII as Bishop of Belcastro. He served as Bishop of Belcastro until his death in 1591.

References

External links and additional sources
 (for Chronology of Bishops) 
 (for Chronology of Bishops) 

16th-century Italian Roman Catholic bishops
Bishops appointed by Pope Gregory XIII
1591 deaths